Duck Donuts is an American doughnut shop chain based in Mechanicsburg, Pennsylvania. Duck Donuts was founded in 2006 in Duck, North Carolina, by Russ DiGilio and Robin Griffith, and has since expanded to over 100 locations in the United States (as of November 2022). The chain's products include customizable, made-to-order doughnuts, other baked goods, and a range of beverages.

History and operations

Headquartered at 6230 Carlisle Pike in Hampden Township, near Mechanicsburg, Pennsylvania, Duck Donuts was founded in 2006 by Russell "Russ" DiGilio, who saw a need for "warm, fresh, made-to-order doughnuts", and Robin Griffith. Both natives of Delaware County, Pennsylvania, the duo met in 1992 while working in the assisted living industry.

Prior to Duck Donuts, there were no doughnut shops in North Carolina's Outer Banks. The first Duck Donuts shop was opened in Duck, North Carolina, from which the chain got its name, followed by a second location in Kitty Hawk. The third and fourth Duck Donut shops were opened in Corolla and Kill Devil Hills respectively.

For half a decade, Duck Donuts was limited to the Outer Banks, but after receiving numerous inquiries about franchising, DiGiglio finally decided to establish the Duck Donuts Franchising Company; the first franchise location was opened in Williamsburg, Virginia, in 2013. Thereafter, the franchise began expanding to other states including Florida, New Jersey, and Georgia. According to a July 2018 Franchising.com article, there are "69 open franchise locations 140 additional contracts in 23 states and two countries". In May 2018, Duck Donuts opened its first New York location in Hauppauge, and two months later in July they opened their inaugural West Coast location in Huntington Beach, California. In December 2018, it had expanded to Minnesota with a Woodbury location. By June 2020 Duck Donuts expanded, opening their first location in Bayamón, Puerto Rico, and in September 2020 the company opened its first store in Dubai, UAE.

Charitable contributions and services
In March 2017, Duck Donuts announced its collaboration with the Nashville-based nonprofit organization Gabe's Chemo Duck Program for children with cancer, and raised some $75,000 in September via its countrywide "Quack Gives Back" initiative.

Products
Duck Donuts' menu predominantly comprises doughnuts, sandwiches, coffee, and desserts. The "cake doughnuts" at Duck Donuts are made-to-order and customizable, with topping options including "chopped bacon" and peanuts. The entire doughnut-making process is automated using doughnut makers from Belshaw Adamatic. Among the four kinds of breakfast sandwiches sold by Duck Donuts is the OBX, which is described as "a sliced doughnut with egg, cheese, sausage or bacon and topped with maple drizzle and chopped bacon". Duck Donuts' dessert selection includes doughnut sundaes made with Breyers ice cream.

See also

 List of restaurant chains in the United States
 List of fast food restaurant chains

References

External links
 
 

Restaurants established in 2006
2006 establishments in North Carolina
Bakeries of the United States
Doughnut shops in the United States
Companies based in Cumberland County, Pennsylvania
Restaurants in North Carolina
Restaurants in New York (state)
Restaurants in Virginia
Restaurants in Ohio
Coffeehouses and cafés in the United States